Jayakodige Dona  Dhanuka Bimal Jayakody (born on 21 June 1977: as බිමල් ජයකොඩි), popularly known as Bimal Jayakody is an actor in Sri Lankan cinema and television. The highly versatile actor, Jayakody is known for many dramatic roles and award nominations at film festivals.

Personal life
Jayakodi was born as the eldest of the family, where his father is a regional politician and also an actor. His brother is a musician. He met his wife Sujani Menaka, who is also a Sri Lankan teledrama and film actress during the teledrama Ramya Suramya back in 2000. They married in 2007 after seven years of affair.

His father's two sisters - Geetha Kanthi Jayakody and Rathna Lalani Jayakody are also renowned award-winning actresses in Sri Lankan cinema, theater and television. Popular actress Paboda Sandeepani is the daughter of Geetha Kanthi. Rathna Lalani is married to fellow actor Sampath Tennakoon.

Career
Jayakody started drama as a television technician. After that, after working for about 6 years, he got the opportunity to join a television serial Hada Vila Sakmana directed by Prasanna Jayakody. After that, he continued to work as a technician and actor. He also worked as a producer in a media company. Jayakody is mainly a television actor, who contributed a diverse array of television serials of many genres. Apart from television, he also acted in a few stage plays such as Apahu Enna Ba.

Jayakody started his film career with Ali Patiyo Oyay Mamai back in 2006, though a minor role. After that, he played many leading and critically acclaimed roles on many occasions in cinema, such as in Sankranthi, Gamani, Aba, Siri Parakum and Sakkarang. He was nominated on several occasions for Gamani and Sakkarang and gain critical acclaim.  In 2008, he acted in Sri Lanka's first Digital movie named Hetawath Mata Adaraya Karanna. The film was telecast on Valentine's Day, 14 February 2008 through the Citi Hitz Satellite movie channel of Dialog Television.

He won the award for the Best Actor at the 2012 Raigam Tele'es for his role in Senakeliyay Maya. He is also nominated for Best Supporting Actor in several awards at the local stage drama festivals and television festivals.

Selected television serials

 Amaa
 Agni piyapath
 Anavaratha
 Angana 
 Athuru Mithuru
 Bharyawo
 Bhava Arana
 Daam
 Degammadiyawa as Wimale
 Devana Warama
 Deweni Inima as Ravi Fernando
 Ehipillamak Yata as Megha 
 Hada Vila Sakmana
 Husma Saha Oxygen
 Ithirena Kiri
 Ihirunu Kiri
 Jeewithaya Dakinna
 Jeewithayata Idadenna
 Kadathira
 Maya Ranaga
 Mihidum Sevaneli 
 Mihidum Sihina 
 Olu 2
 Pabalu
 Pani Makuluwo
 Raahu
 Rala as Priyankara
 Ralla Veralata Adarei as Weerawarna Kulasuriya
 Ramya Suramya
 Rasthiyadukaraya 
 Sadhisi Tharanaya, 
 Sagare Se Man Adarei
 Samanala Wasanthaya
 Samanalunta Wedithiyanna
 Sanakeliyai Maya
 See Raja 
 Sihina Aran Enna
 Sithin Siyawara 
 Snap
 Sulanga Maha Meraka
 Thamba Pata Handewa
 Veeduru Mal
 Vishnu Sankranthiya
 Vishwanthari
 Wara Mal
 Wasana Wewa

Singing career
Jayakodi released his first song Oba Aye Dawasaka in 2014.

Filmography

Awards and accolades

Raigam Tele'es Awards

|-
|| 2012 ||| Senakeliyay Maya || Best Actor ||

References

External links
 සුජානි එක්ක, එක වහලක් යටට ආ දින
 ලබන අවුරුද්දේ තුන්වැනියෙක් බලාපොරොත්තු වෙනවා
 දස වසක් සපිරෙන බිමල් – සුජානි ආදර කතාවේ රහස
 I can see the Danger - Bimal & Sujani Menaka
 හොඳින් ඉන්නවා - Sujani Menaka
 Love Talk is with popular actress Sujani Menaka
 Need good understanding for better family life
 Pride and patriotism!
 සුජානි මේනකා - Hiru Gossip - Hiru FM

Sri Lankan male film actors
Sinhalese male actors
Living people
1977 births